The Battle of Lovcha, or Loftcha (today Lovech), was a battle of the Russo-Turkish War (1877–1878) which occurred during the siege of Plevna. Russian forces successfully reduced the fortress at Lovcha, which had protected Plevna's communication and supply lines.

In July 1877, shortly after the siege of Plevna began, the garrison's commander, Osman Pasha, received 15 battalions of reinforcements from Sofia. He chose to use these reinforcements to fortify Lovcha, which protected his lines of support running from Orchanie (present-day Botevgrad) to Plevna.

After the failure of the first two attempts to storm the city of Plevna, the Russians brought up significant reinforcements, and the investing army now totaled 100,000. Intent on cutting Osman's communications and supply lines, General Alexander Imeretinsky was sent out with 22,703 Russian troops to seize Lovcha.

On 1 September Generals Alexander Imerentinsky, Mikhail Skobelev, and Vladimir Dobrovolsky reached Lovcha and attacked the city. Fighting continued for the next two days. Osman marched out of Plevna to the relief of Lovcha, but on 3 September, before he could reach Lovcha, it fell to the Russians. Survivors of the battle withdrew into Plevna and were organized into 3 battalions. After the loss of Lovcha, these additional troops brought Osman's force up to 30,000, the largest it would be during the siege. The Russians settled on the strategy of a complete investment of Plevna, and with the loss of its major supply route, the fall of Plevna was inevitable.

See also
 Battles of the Russo-Turkish War (1877–78)

Sources
 Compton's Home Library: Battles of the World CD-ROM
 Бръняков Б., Действията около град Ловеч през Освободителната война 1877 -1878 г., Печатница „ Светлина “, Ловеч, 1928 г.

Lovcha, Battle of
Lovech
1877 in Bulgaria
Lovcha
History of Lovech Province
Lovcha
September 1877 events